Sol Gabetta (born 18 April 1981) is an Argentine cellist. The daughter of Andrés Gabetta and Irène Timacheff-Gabetta, she has French and Russian ancestry. Her brother Andrés is a baroque violinist.

Career
Gabetta began to learn violin at the age of three, and cello at age four. She continued to study both instruments until age eight, and then switched her focus exclusively to the cello. She won her first competition at the age of 10, soon followed by the Natalia Gutman Award. Her teachers include Christine Waleska, Leo Viola, Ivan Monighetti at Reina Sofía School of Music, Piero Farulli and Ljerko Spiller.

Gabetta won the Crédit Suisse Young Artist Award in 2004. In 2006, she founded her own festival, the Festival Solsberg. Her debut with the Berlin Philharmonic and Sir Simon Rattle was at the Baden-Baden Easter Festival in 2014. Her debut with the Staatskapelle Berlin occurred in December 2014. She was Artist in Residence at the Schleswig-Holstein Musik Festival in summer 2014, and also held artistic residencies at the Philharmonie and Konzerthaus Berlin. She was awarded the Herbert von Karajan Prize at the Salzburg Easter Festival in 2018.

Other prizes have included the Gramophone Award for Young Artist of the Year in 2010 and the Würth Prize of Jeunesses Musicales Germany in 2012. At the Echo Klassik Awards, she received the award in 2007, 2009 and 2013, being named Instrumentalist of the Year in 2013. She received the Diapason d'Or for her recordings of Haydn, Mozart and Elgar cello concerti, as well as works by Tchaikovsky and Ginastera. Gabetta has made commercial recordings for Sony and Deutsche Grammophon.

Contemporary composers who have written music for Gabetta include Michel van der Aa, who composed Up-close for Gabetta and the Amsterdam Sinfonietta, and Pēteris Vasks, who wrote his cello concerto 'Presence' for Gabetta. In November 2015, Gabetta's album of the music of Vasks, Presence, was released, which includes the cello concerto 'Presence', and "Musique du Soir" for organ and cello, for which daughter and mother perform together.

Supported by a private stipend from the Rahn Kulturfonds, Gabetta performs on a cello by G. B. Guadagnini dating from 1759. She resides in Switzerland and has been teaching cello at the Basel Music Academy since 2005.  She is also a regular presenter for the programme KlickKlack, for Bavarian Radio (BR-Klassik).

Discography
Tchaikovsky, Saint-Saëns and Ginastera – with Munich Radio Orchestra (Sony Classical) August 2006
Il Progetto Vivaldi – with Sonatori de la Gioiosa Marca (Sony Classical) released September 2007
Cantabile – with Prague Philharmonic (Sony Classical) released September 2008
Shostakovich Concerto No. 2 – with Munich Philharmonic (Sony Classical) released September 2008
Haydn / Hofmann / Mozart: Cello Concertos – with Kammerorchester Basel (Sony Classical) released September 2009
Elgar: Cello Concerto / Dvořák – with Danish National Symphony Orchestra (Sony Classical) released June 2010
Pēteris Vasks: Gramata Cellam – The Book for Solo Cello (Sony Classical) released March 2010
Shostakovich Concerto No. 1 – with Munich Philharmonic and Lorin Maazel (Sony Classical) released August 2012
Duo – with Hélène Grimaud (Deutsche Grammophon) released October 2012 
Il Progetto Vivaldi II (Sony Classical) released December 2012
Il Progetto Vivaldi III (Sony Classical) released September 2013
Prayer (Sony Classical) released October 2014
The Chopin Album – with Bertrand Chamayou (Sony Classical) released February 2015
Beethoven Triple Concerto – with Kammerorchester Basel (Sony Classical) released September 2015
Vasks – Presence – with the Amsterdam Sinfonietta (Sony Classical) released November 2015
Elgar: Cello Concerto / Martinů: Cello Concerto No.1 – with Berlin Philharmonic (Sony Classical) released November 2016
Dolce Duello: Cecilia & Sol – with Cecilia Bartoli (Decca Classics) released 11 November 2017
Schumann – (Sony Classical) released November 2018
Camille Saint-Saëns, Cello Concerto n°1 & n°2, Sol Gabetta, cello, Les Siècles, conductor François-Xavier Roth. Warner (2021)
Plaisirs illumines – Sol Gabetta with Patricia Kopatchinskaja and Camerata Bern, Sony Classical, January 8 2021
Sol & Pat - Sol Gabetta with Patricia Kopatchinskaja and Camerata Bern Sony Classical, October 8 2021

Personal life
She is the youngest of four children of Andrés Gabetta and Irène Timacheff, parents of French and Russian descent. Her older brother Andrés is a professional violinist. She speaks six languages, Spanish, French, Russian, Italian, German and English.

Sol is married to Balthazar Soulier, with whom she has a son.

Films 
Sol Gabetta joue Haydn et Vasks. ZDF 2009. Producers: David Stevens, Gösta Courkamp. Performed at the Solsberg Festival. Haydn's Concerto and Dolcissimo (2nd movement of Gramata Cellam; The book) by Vasks.
Sol Gabetta, A Part of My Soul: Portrait of the cellist Sol Gabetta. 2013. Written by Annette Schreier. Producers: NDR / Screen Land Film

References

External links
 
 Harrison-Parrott agency profile of Sol Gabetta
 Müller & Pavlik German-language agency profile of Sol Gabetta
 Solsberg Festival page
 Sol Gabetta biography, albums and photos at cosmopolis.ch
 'La violoncellista cordobesa Sol Gabetta fue premiada nuevamente en Europa', Cadena3, 20 October 2009

1981 births
Argentine classical cellists
Argentine classical musicians
Argentine people of French descent
Argentine people of Russian descent
Living people
People from Villa María
Women cellists
21st-century women musicians
Herbert von Karajan Prize winners